Měčín is a town in Klatovy District in the Plzeň Region of the Czech Republic. It has about 1,100 inhabitants.

Administrative parts
Villages of Bíluky, Hráz, Nedanice, Nedaničky, Osobovy, Petrovice, Radkovice and Třebýcina are administrative parts of Měčín.

References

Cities and towns in the Czech Republic
Populated places in Klatovy District